Arthur Christian Holder (born 18 June 1949) is a British-Trinidadian artist who has worked in many fields – like his father Boscoe Holder: as a dancer, choreographer, actor, teacher, costume designer, writer, painter and singer. He is most notable as "one of the most iconic dancers of the Joffrey company in the 1970s, perhaps in its history."

Life and career

Early years and education
Arthur Christian Holder was born in Trinidad into an artistic family, the son of Boscoe Holder and his wife Sheila Clarke Holder, who were both professional dancers. (His maternal grandmother was the actress and radio personality Kathleen Davis – known as "Aunty Kay" – and his uncle was the actor Geoffrey Holder.) The Holders moved to London when their son was an infant. Boscoe Holder, who later became a renowned painter, at the time ran a company called Boscoe Holder and his Caribbean Dancers, and throughout childhood Christian appeared with them, and on British television and in repertory theatre. As a four-year-old Christian danced with his father's company at the coronation of Queen Elizabeth II in 1953, and by the age of seven he had begun training in ballet, and aged 11 attended the Corona Academy Stage School. In an unfinished 1955 production of Moby Dick, directed by Orson Welles, Holder had the role of Pip the Cabin Boy.

Move to New York
In 1963 Holder was one of a select group of young dancers to be offered scholarships by Martha Graham to study at her school in New York City, so as to return to London "to be charter members of what was to become London Contemporary Dance Theatre". The following year his parents saw him off to the US.

He went on to enrol as a student at the High School of Performing Arts in New York City, where he was spotted by Robert Joffrey. Joining the Joffrey Ballet, Holder remained with the company from 1966 to 1979, becoming one of their most acclaimed principal dancers, performing as a soloist with choreographers including Kurt Jooss (who personally trained Holder for the lead role of "Death" in a revival of his 1932 anti-war ballet, The Green Table), Leonid Massine, Jerome Robbins, Alvin Ailey, and Agnes De Mille. A New York Magazine review in 1971 typically commented: "...Christian Holder, lithe, tremendously powerful and totally individual, dominates the stage whenever he is given solo work to do.... Up the Joffrey! Onward, Christian Holder!"

From 1979 to 1981 he appeared as guest solo dancer with San Francisco Opera, dancing in productions starring Luciano Pavarotti, and Placido Domingo, and choreographed their productions of The Merry Widow with Dame Joan Sutherland and Aida (2001). In 2006, he performed in the Joffrey Ballet’s production of Sir Frederick Ashton's Cinderella, as one of the ugly stepsisters along with Gary Chryst, which roles Joffrey (who died in 1988) had always wanted them to play.

The 2012 documentary film Joffrey: Mavericks of American Dance, written and directed by Bob Hercules, contains archive footage of Holder.

During his career Holder choreographed ballets including Weren't We Fools? for American Ballet Theatre and Transcendence for Atlanta Ballet, appeared in repertory theatre productions and musicals, and has designed costumes for ballets including Margo Sappington's Toulouse-Lautrec (2000) for the Ballet du Capitole in Toulouse, France. He has also designed costumes for Tina Turner (between 1974 and 1984), Ann Reinking and others. In addition, Holder has taught ballet at Steps On Broadway in New York City, the Metropolitan Opera Ballet, Kaatsbaan International Dance Center, PeriDance, and for Cedar Lake Dance.

Return to London and recent years
After decades in the US, Holder returned to live in England, where he has been involved in various creative work. In 2010, his paintings and designs were exhibited in London alongside the work of his father Boscoe Holder and that of master designer Oliver Messel, a family friend.

A recent project is writing the book and lyrics for a theatre piece called Verse of Fortune (in collaboration with Noa Ain) inspired by the life and work of French poet Baudelaire.

In April 2015 Holder made his debut as a singer in his one-man cabaret entitled "At Home and Abroad", with music direction by Philip Foster, playing a sold-out show at The Crazy Coqs in London's Piccadilly, where he performed his own compositions as well as songs by Cole Porter, Noël Coward, Stephen Sondheim, Peter Allen and Rodgers & Hart. A subsequent show in May 2016 at the same venue was entitled SUITE 60 and received a four-star review from BritishTheatre.com, where Douglas Mayo commented: "Holder succeeds in weaving a spell over his audience. It’s a blend of live performance and multi-media, that is perfectly placed in the intimacy of a venue like Crazy Coqs....his ability to deliver truth and drama through song enables him to captivate an audience for nearly two hours and leave them wanting more."

In August 2016, Holder appeared at the Victoria & Albert Museum in conversation with Greta Chaffer, in a special event entitled "Christian Holder: A life in performance, New York and London".

Awards
On 7 April 1991, Christian Holder, Boscoe Holder, and Geoffrey Holder jointly received, in Philadelphia, the first Drexel University Award for International Excellence. Also, an award for Outstanding Contribution to the Arts was given to him by Philadanco in 1995.

References

External links
 Official website.
 Christian Holder at IMDb.
 "Joffrey Mavericks of American Dance: Exclusive Interviews From The Film Premiere In NYC", video interview with Christian Holder. YouTube.
 Dorothy Kincaid, "Dance, Dress, and Design With Flair" (article on Christian Holder), The Milwaukee Sentinel, 16 February 1977.
 "Ballet and race: black or white?", Londonballetblog, 24 September 2013. With photograph captioned: "Christian Holder takes a jump in Animus (choreographed by Gerald Arpino), with the Joffrey ballet in 1969".

1949 births
Living people
British male dancers
British people of Trinidad and Tobago descent
British choreographers
British costume designers
Black British male actors
British male singers
Trinidad and Tobago dancers
Trinidad and Tobago expatriates in the United Kingdom
British cabaret performers
Ballet choreographers
Black British artists
Trinidad and Tobago choreographers
Trinidad and Tobago artists